John Joseph Gerry (1 June 1927 – 13 December 2017) was a Roman Catholic bishop.

Gerry was ordained to the priesthood in 1950. He served as titular bishop of 'Louth' and as auxiliary of the Roman Catholic Archdiocese of Brisbane, Australia from 1975 until 2003.

Notes

External links

1927 births
2017 deaths
20th-century Roman Catholic bishops in Australia
21st-century Roman Catholic bishops in Australia
Roman Catholic bishops of Brisbane